Rhea's Mill Township (pronounced  ) is one of thirty-seven townships in Washington County, Arkansas, USA. As of the 2000 census, its total population was 480.

Geography

Cities, towns, villages
Rhea

Cemeteries
The township contains Crawford Cemetery.

Major routes
The township contains no state highways.

References

 United States Census Bureau 2008 TIGER/Line Shapefiles
 United States National Atlas

External links
 US-Counties.com
 City-Data.com

Townships in Washington County, Arkansas
Populated places established in 1880
1880 establishments in Arkansas
Townships in Arkansas